The Speaker of the Alberta Legislative Assembly, is the presiding officer in the Legislative Assembly of Alberta.

The Speaker is selected by secret ballot in the first session of a new legislative assembly.

List of speakers

See also
Speaker of the House of Commons of Canada
Speaker of the Senate of Canada

External links
Alberta Legislative Assembly List of Speakers
History of the Speakers of the Assembly Hansard May 16, 2006

Alberta
Politics of Alberta

Speak